The 2013 Settimana Internazionale di Coppi e Bartali was the 28th edition of the Settimana Internazionale di Coppi e Bartali cycling stage race. It started on 20 March in Gatteo and ended on 24 March in Fiorano Modenese.

The race was officially presented on 12 March 2013 in Sant'Angelo di Gatteo. It consisted of four full stages and two half-stages; the first stage, second half-stage (Stage 1b) was a particular team time trial in which each team was split into two separate mini-teams, with the final time taken on the third rider who crossed the finish line.

The race was won by 's Italian rider Diego Ulissi, who took the leader's red jersey by winning the second stage. His teammate Damiano Cunego was second in the General classification, was the winner of the Points classification, as well as the third stage. Colombian rider Miguel Ángel Rubiano completed the podium. Alessandro Mazzi of  won the King of the Mountains classification, and Francesco Manuel Bongiorno won the Young rider classification.  was first in the Teams classification.

Teams
The 25 teams were:
Pro Teams

 
 
 
 

Professional Continental Teams

 
 
 
 
 
 
 
 
 
 
 
 

Continental Teams

Race overview

Classification leadership table

Final standings

General classification

Points classification

King of the Mountains classification

Young rider classification

Teams classification

References

External links
 Official website

Settimana Internazionale di Coppi e Bartali
2013 in Italian sport
Settimana Internazionale di Coppi e Bartali